Geraint Owen (1966 – 11 July 2009) was a Welsh actor and politician.

Career

Acting career
Owen acted in the Welsh-language soap Pobol y Cwm from 1991 to 1996.

Political career
Owen was a councillor for Plaid Cymru and had stood in assembly and parliamentary elections, contesting the Neath constituency in the 2005 election. Owen came second to Peter Hain in the election.

Personal life
Owen was the elder brother of TV presenter Rhodri Owen. Owen died on 11 July 2009, at the age of 43.

References

1966 births
2009 deaths
Councillors in Wales
Plaid Cymru politicians
Welsh male soap opera actors